Gy is a commune in the Haute-Saône department in the region of Bourgogne-Franche-Comté in eastern France.

History
In 1389, a dispute arose over the rights to mint coins between the Duke of Burgundy, and the Archbishop of Besançon Guillaume de Vergy. 
The Bishop excommunicated the duke and several companions. In response, the Duke of Burgundy gave siege to the fortresses of Noroy and the castle of Gy. However, the Archbishop escaped via an underground passage and found refuge in Avignon where he excommunicated the count of Burgundy.

By 1801, the population of the town had reached 2,695, and peaked about a decade later. By 1901 it had dropped to 1,621 people and by 2017, only 1,049.

Landmarks
  The Château de Gyrésidence des archevêques de Besançon 
 Habitat vigneron et vieux bourg médiéval
 Hôtel de ville de Gy
 Église Saint-Symphorien de Gy
 Grande fontaine de Gy
 Lavoir de Gy

Notable people
 Claude-Antoine Bolot
 Luis Francisque Lélut
 Noël André (1728-1808).
 Charles Marie Albert Travelet.

See also
Communes of the Haute-Saône department

References

Communes of Haute-Saône